Passing Through (also known as Passing Thru) is a 1921 American silent comedy film directed by William A. Seiter and written by Agnes Christine Johnston, and Joseph F. Poland. The film stars Douglas MacLean, Madge Bellamy, Otto Hoffman, Cameron Coffey, Fred Gamble, Bert Hadley, and Margaret Livingston. The film was released on August 14, 1921, by Paramount Pictures. It is not known whether the film currently survives, which suggests that it is a lost film.

Plot

Cast 
Douglas MacLean as Billy Barton
Madge Bellamy as Mary Spivins 
Otto Hoffman as James Spivins
Cameron Coffey as Willie Spivins
Fred Gamble as Hezikah Briggs
Bert Hadley as Henry Kingston
Margaret Livingston as Louise Kingston
Louis Natheaux as Fred Kingston
Willis Robards as Silas Harkins
Edith Yorke as Mother Harkins

References

External links 

 

1921 films
1920s English-language films
Silent American comedy films
1921 comedy films
Paramount Pictures films
Films directed by William A. Seiter
American black-and-white films
American silent feature films
Films with screenplays by Joseph F. Poland
1920s American films